Ustyluh or Ustilug is a town in Volodymyr Raion, Volyn Oblast, Ukraine. Population: 

Igor Stravinsky had an estate in Ustyluh and visited it frequently between 1890 and 1914. His mansion is now a museum.

History 

Until the Russian Revolution of 1917, it was a settlement in Vladimir-Volynsky Uyezd of Volhynian Governorate of the Russian Empire; from 1921 to 1939 it was part of Wołyń Voivodeship of Poland.

Town since 1940

Prior to World War II it had a population of at least 3,200 Jews. The Germans bombarded Ustyluh heavily on the morning of 22 June 1941, the day of the outbreak of war between the Soviet Union and Germany. The German Army conquered the town toward evening. The Germans established a Jewish ghetto, a Judenrat, and a ghetto police force, and used the town′s Jews for slave labor. From time to time the Germans took groups of Jewish youth to a valley next to the Jewish cemetery and shot them. In October 1941 alone, the Germans killed 900 Jews from the town intelligentsia. The Germans transferred the remaining Jews of Ustyluh to the Volodymyr ghetto between September 1 and 15, 1942, and murdered them there along with the local Jews in pits prepared for the killings in the village of Piatydnie.

In January 1989 the population was 2404 people.

References

Cities in Volyn Oblast
Cities of district significance in Ukraine
Vladimir-Volynsky Uyezd
Wołyń Voivodeship (1921–1939)